, formerly written as , is a Buddhist temple in Higashiyama-ku in Kyoto, Japan.  For centuries, Sennyū-ji has been a mausoleum for noble families and members of the Imperial House of Japan. Located within the temple grounds are the official tombs of Emperor Shijō and many of the emperors who came after him.

History
Sennyū-ji was founded in the early Heian period. According to another tradition, this temple was a reconstruction of an earlier temple, which had been founded by Kōbō-Daishi in the Tenchō era (824-834). The major buildings in Sennyū-ji were reconstructed and enlarged in the early 13th century by the monk Shunjō.

Tsukinowa no misasagi
Emperor Go-Horikawa and Emperor Shijō were the first to be enshrined in an Imperial mausoleum at Sennyū-ji.  It was called Tsukinowa no misasagi.

Art
Sennyū-ji's large nehan-zu'' painting depicts Buddha on his death bed.  This massive image (8 meters x 16 meters) is the largest in Japan.  The image at nearby Tōfuku-ji is the second largest of its kind in Japan, measuring 7 meters x 14 meters. Both images are only rarely displayed, most recently in 2003 for three days only.

See also
 Tsuki no wa no misasagi
 Tōfuku-ji
 List of Buddhist temples in Kyoto
Thirteen Buddhist Sites of Kyoto
 List of National Treasures of Japan (ancient documents)
 For an explanation of terms concerning Japanese Buddhism, Japanese Buddhist art, and Japanese Buddhist temple architecture, see the Glossary of Japanese Buddhism.

Notes

References

External links

  Senyū-ji website 

Buddhist temples in Kyoto
1st-millennium establishments in Japan
Religious organizations established in the 9th century
Important Cultural Properties of Japan